Bent Jensen (born 6 June 1947) is a Danish former football player.

References

External links
 Danish national team profile 
 
 

1947 births
Living people
Footballers from Odense
Danish men's footballers
Denmark under-21 international footballers
Denmark international footballers
FC Girondins de Bordeaux players
Ligue 1 players
Eintracht Braunschweig players
Bundesliga players
Association football forwards
Boldklubben 1913 players
Danish expatriate men's footballers
Expatriate footballers in France
Expatriate footballers in Germany
Danish expatriate sportspeople in France
Danish expatriate sportspeople in Germany